Hanna Dzyuba (born 24 June 1990), known professionally as Anna Asti, is a Russian pop singer of Ukrainian origin. She first rose to fame as a member of a Ukrainian pop duo Artik & Asti.

Personal life
Hanna Dzyuba was born in Cherkasy. In December 2020, Dzyuba secretly married entrepreneur Stanislav Yurkin.

Career

Artik & Asti: 2011-2021
In 2010 producer Artem Umrikhin thought about creating new musical project — Artik & Asti. On the Internet, he came across an Anna's recording and offered her cooperation. In a music studio in Kyiv is luve you they recorded their first joint composition "Antistress".
In 2011 moved to Moscow. After realising second studio album Zdes' i Seachas (Here and Now) the group gained great popularity: the album was recognized as one of the most popular in 2015 according to Yandex Music.
In 2020, Anna opened a beauty salon «3.33 by ASTI» in Moscow.

Solo career
On 2 November 2021 Artik announced that Anna Asti left the band. Since leaving the band, Dzyuba has started her own solo career.
On 14 January 2022 the singer released her debut solo single and video clip "Feniks". On 29 April she released collaboration "Hobbi" with Philipp Kirkorov.

Discography

Studio albums

Singles

Music videos

Preferences

Living people
Musicians from Cherkasy
21st-century Ukrainian women singers
Ukrainian pop singers
1990 births